Vault of the Ni'er Queyon is a 1982 role-playing game adventure for Space Opera published by Fantasy Games Unlimited.

Contents
Vault of the Ni'er Queyon is an adventure that features a quest covering vast distances and a large amount of game time.

Reception
Kenneth Uecker reviewed Vault of the Ni'er Queyon in The Space Gamer No. 52. Uecker commented that "Overall, Vault of the Ni'er Queyon is an excellent adventure, well worth the price. There is a wealth of background data. With a few exceptions, this will be easily adapted to most Space Opera campaigns."

Reviews
Different Worlds #31 (Nov., 1983)

References

Role-playing game supplements introduced in 1982
Space Opera adventures